The Dayton, OH Metropolitan Statistical Area, also known as Greater Dayton and the Miami Valley, as defined by the United States Census Bureau, is an area consisting of three counties in the Miami Valley region of  Ohio and is anchored by the city of Dayton. As of 2020, it is the fourth largest metropolitan area in Ohio and the 73rd largest metropolitan area by population in the United States with a population of 814,049.

Counties
Greene
Miami
Montgomery

Cities

Places with more than 100,000 inhabitants 
Dayton (principal city) – 137,644

Places with 25,000 to 100,000 inhabitants 

Kettering – 57,862	
Beavercreek – 47,741
Huber Heights – 38,154
Fairborn – 34,620
Xenia – 26,947
Troy – 26,281
Riverside – 25,133

Places with 10,000 to 25,000 inhabitants 
Trotwood – 24,403
Centerville – 24,240		
Piqua – 21,332
Miamisburg – 20,143
Springboro – 18,931
Vandalia – 14,997
Englewood – 13,435
Clayton – 13,222
West Carrollton – 12,864
Tipp City – 10,115

Places with 5,000 to 10,000 inhabitants 
Oakwood – 8,936
Bellbrook – 7,344
Union – 6,891
Moraine – 6,470
Brookville – 5,874
Germantown – 5,519
Carlisle – 5,446

Places with 1,000 to 5,000 inhabitants 
West Milton – 4,828
Cedarville – 4,320	
New Lebanon – 3,984
Yellow Springs – 3,744	
Covington – 2,708
Wilberforce – 2,271
Shawnee Hills – 2,171
Jamestown – 2,136	
Drexel – 2,076
Bradford – 1,866
Pleasant Hill – 1,254

Places with fewer than 1,000 inhabitants
Bowersville
Casstown
Clifton (partial)
College Corner (partial)
Eldorado
Farmersville
Fletcher
Gratis
Laura
Ludlow Falls
Phillipsburg
Potsdam
Spring Valley
Verona
West Elkton
West Manchester

Unincorporated places
Brandt
Byron
Chautauqua (partial)
Conover
Fairhaven
Fort McKinley
Morning Sun
New Hope
Northridge
Phoneton
Pyrmont
Shiloh
West Charleston
Woodbourne-Hyde Park

Townships

Greene County

Bath Township
Beavercreek Township
Caesarscreek Township
Cedarville Township
Jefferson Township
Miami Township
New Jasper Township
Ross Township
Silvercreek Township
Spring Valley Township
Sugarcreek Township
Xenia Township

Miami County

Bethel Township
Brown Township
Concord Township
Elizabeth Township
Lostcreek Township
Monroe Township
Newberry Township
Newton Township
Springcreek Township
Staunton Township
Union Township
Washington Township

Montgomery County

Butler Township
Clay Township
German Township
Harrison Township
Jackson Township
Jefferson Township
Miami Township
Perry Township
Washington Township

Combined statistical area
The Dayton–Springfield–Sidney Combined Statistical Area is a CSA in the U.S. state of Ohio, as defined by the United States Census Bureau. It consists of the Dayton Metropolitan Statistical Area (the counties of Montgomery, Greene and Miami); the Springfield Metropolitan Statistical Area (Clark County); the Urbana Micropolitan Statistical Area (Champaign County); the Greenville Micropolitan Statistical Area (Darke County); and the Sidney Micropolitan Statistical Area (Shelby County). As of the 2020 Census, the CSA had a population of 1,086,512.

Metropolitan Statistical Areas (MSAs)
Dayton (Greene, Miami, and Montgomery counties)
Springfield (Clark County)
Micropolitan Statistical Areas (μSAs)
Greenville (Darke County)
Urbana (Champaign County)
Sidney (Shelby County)

According to an article in The Cincinnati Enquirer, as Greater Cincinnati grows northward through Butler County, its outer suburbs are expected to expand and begin to overlap the Greater Dayton area. Such a concept has already received the nickname of "Daytonnati." The two metropolitan areas were expected to be combined after tabulation of the 2010 Census, but this did not occur. As of the 2020 census this has still not occurred due to criteria not being met for combined area designation

Greater Dayton is part of the Great Lakes Megalopolis containing an estimated 54 million people.

Demographics

As of the census 2010, there were 799,232 people, 343,971 households, and 220,249 families residing within the MSA. The racial makeup of the MSA was 80.40% White, 14.90% African American, 0.20% Native American, 1.80% Asian, 0.01% Pacific Islander, 0.80% from other races, and 2.00% from two or more races. Hispanic or Latino of any race were 1.90% of the population.

The median income for a household in the MSA was $47,381, and the median income for a family was $59,770. Males had a median income of $38,430 versus $26,205 for females. The per capita income for the MSA was $25,436.

From the 2000 Census to the 2010 Census, the Dayton region has seen a shift in population from its urban core to more out-lying affluent suburbs. This is evidenced by a 10% growth in population in Englewood, a 19% population growth in Beavercreek, and a 40% population growth in Springboro. Smaller growths in the 2010 census in the Dayton area included Miamisburg, Centerville, Vandalia, and Fairborn.
Many of Dayton's suburbs that saw declines in populations fared well from 2000 to 2010. Dayton's largest suburb, Kettering for example, only saw a 2.3% decline during the ten-year period and Huber Heights, Dayton's third largest suburb, saw a 0.3% decline in population.

The Dayton Metropolitan Statistical Area formerly included Clark County and Preble County. In 2005, Clark County containing Springfield, Ohio separated from the Dayton MSA to create their own MSA named Springfield Metropolitan Statistical Area. As a result of new Census criteria to delineate metropolitan areas, Preble County was eliminated from the MSA in 2013 as it no longer qualified for inclusion.  A significant drop in population for the Dayton MSA is noted in the 2010 census because of these changes.

Colleges and universities

Greater Dayton is home to a number of higher education facilities, including:
 Air Force Institute of Technology (Wright-Patterson AFB)
 Antioch College (Yellow Springs)
 Cedarville University (Cedarville)
 Central State University (Wilberforce)
 Hobart Institute of Welding Technology (Troy)
 Kettering College of Medical Arts (Kettering)
 Sinclair Community College (Dayton)
 University of Dayton (Dayton)
 Wilberforce University (Wilberforce)
 Wittenberg University (Springfield)
 Wright State University (Fairborn)
 Clark State Community College (Springfield)

Largest employers
Notable largest employers in the Dayton region :

 Wright-Patterson Air Force Base 30,000
 Premier Health Partners 14,335
 Kettering Health Network 9,500
 Montgomery County 5,029
 CareSource 4,500
 The Kroger Company 4,100
 Wright State University 3,095
 LexisNexis 3,000
 University of Dayton 2,978
 Honda Manufacturing of America 2,940

Transportation

Airports
Greater Dayton is served by international, regional and county airports, including:
 Dahio Trotwood Airport
 Dayton International Airport
 Dayton–Wright Brothers Airport
 Greene County–Lewis A. Jackson Regional Airport
 Moraine Airpark
 Wright-Patterson Air Force Base

Major highways 
 Interstate 70
 Interstate 71
 Interstate 75
 Interstate 675
 U.S. Route 35
 U.S. Route 36
 U.S. Route 40
 U.S. Route 42
 U.S. Route 68
 State Route 4
 State Route 41
 State Route 48
 State Route 49
 State Route 202
 State Route 235
 State Route 444
 State Route 725
 State Route 741
 State Route 844

Public transit
The Greater Dayton Regional Transit Authority operates a public busing system in Montgomery county. Other transit agencies serve the surrounding counties and provide connections with RTA, including transit authorities in Greene and Miami counties.

Culture

Museums
 Dayton Art Institute (Dayton)
 Boonshoft Museum of Discovery (Dayton)
 America's Packard Museum (Dayton)
 National Museum of the United States Air Force (Riverside)
 The Funk Music Hall of Fame & Exhibition Center (Dayton)
 Springfield Museum of Art (Springfield)

Theaters
In addition to Benjamin and Marian Schuster Performing Arts Center, the Dayton Region's largest performing arts center, Greater Dayton has a vibrant theater community throughout the region.

 Actors Theater (Fairborn)
 Beavercreek Community Theatre (Beavercreek)
 Benjamin and Marian Schuster Performing Arts Center (Dayton)
 The Black Box Improv Theater (Dayton)
 Brookville Community Theater (Brookville)
 Clark State Performing Arts Center (Springfield)
 Dayton Playhouse (Dayton)
 La Comedia Dinner Theatre (Springboro)
 Loft Theatre (Dayton)
 Progressive Dance Theater (Dayton)
 Town Hall Theatre (Centerville)
 Victoria Theatre (Dayton)

Theatrical companies
 Dayton Ballet
 Dayton Contemporary Dance Company
 Dayton Opera
 Dayton Theatre Guild
 Human Race Theatre Company
 Victoria Theatre Association

Music
 Dayton Philharmonic Orchestra

See also
Miami Valley
Ohio census statistical areas
List of United States metropolitan statistical areas by population

References

External links
 City of Dayton website
 Visitors Bureau
 Dayton history

 
Montgomery County, Ohio
Greene County, Ohio
Preble County, Ohio
Miami County, Ohio